Switzerland is the title of the third album by Detroit rock band Electric Six.

The album consists of thirteen new tracks. The band commented that:

A music video for the song "I Buy the Drugs" was recorded on July 1, 2006 and was released on their MySpace site in early August. A digital download of the track followed on August 15, 2006.

The album was released on September 12, 2006 in the United States and was followed by releases in the United Kingdom, Germany, France, Italy, the Netherlands and Scandinavia.

Track listing
All lyrics written by Tyler Spencer; all music composed by Tyler Spencer except where noted.
"The Band in Hell" – 3:19
"I Buy the Drugs" – 3:22
"Mr. Woman" – 2:52
"Night Vision" – 4:03
"Infected Girls" (Peters/Shipps) – 3:29
"Pulling the Plug on the Party" – 2:54
"Rubber Rocket" (Tait) – 3:37
"Pink Flamingos" – 2:42
"I Wish This Song Was Louder" – 3:14
"Slices of You" (John Nash) – 4:17
"There's Something Very Wrong With Us, So Let's Go Out Tonight" – 4:23
"Germans in Mexico" – 3:01
"Chocolate Pope" – 1:02

The Australian release of the album under label Inertia Records contains a fourteenth track, a Midnight Juggernauts remix of "The Future Is in the Future" from the band's album Señor Smoke.

Music videos
Lead singer Dick Valentine stated in an interview that the band intends to record a video for every song on the album, "a lot of them...low budget". Seven official videos were released:

Dick Valentine's commentary on the video

.

.

In addition to the official videos released by the band, Electric Six also hosted a contest for the best fan video for the first single on the album, "I Buy the Drugs." Several winning videos were posted on the band's MySpace page but have since been removed.

Personnel
 Dick Valentine - vocals
 John R. Dequindre - bass, harmonica
 Percussion World - drums, cymbal
  - lead guitar
 The Colonel - rhythm guitar, background vocals, sitar
 Tait Nucleus? - synthesizer, piano

Trivia 

 Roughly at 1:50 mark of the track "Infected Girls" there is a speech of the girl telling the story from "Pleasing Interlude I" (a track from the band's second album, Señor Smoke) in Russian in the end in Lithuanian.
 Lead singer Dick Valentine has stated that the name Switzerland was chosen because he had never been there, and hoped that the band would be invited to tour. As of February 2009, Electric Six is scheduled to tour Switzerland in March.
 The album was dedicated to the Swiss tennis player Roger Federer.

Legacy 

 Demo versions of "I Buy the Drugs" and "I Wish This Song was Louder" were subsequently released on the band's first compilation album "Sexy Trash".
 The band performed "I Buy the Drugs" and "Infected Girls" on their first live album "Absolute Pleasure".
 The band performed "I Buy the Drugs" in their live concert film "Absolute Treasure". 
 Demo versions of "Night Vision" and "Slices of You" were subsequently released on the band's second compilation album "Mimicry and Memories". 
 Dick Valentine recorded acoustic versions of "The Band In Hell", "I Buy the Drugs" and "Pink Flamingos" for his solo album "Quiet Time".
 "Night Vision" and "Infected Girls" appeared in the band's mockumentary feature film "Roulette Stars of Metro Detroit", with a remix of "Night Vision" appearing on the accompanying soundtrack album.
 The band performed "Night Vision" and "Germans in Mexico" on their second live album "You're Welcome!".
 The band performed a stripped-down version of "Pink Flamingos", "Night Vision" and "I Buy the Drugs" on their third live album "Chill Out!".

References

External links 
Metropolis Mail Order: album review and track listing

Electric Six albums
2006 albums
Metropolis Records albums